A list of Kenyans who contributed to Kenya's struggle for liberation from colonial rule.

References 

Kenyan rebels